Crush is the 1993 album by Montreal pop-punk band Doughboys. Crush was released on A&M records and was produced by Daniel Rey and mixed by Dave Ogilvie. The album  earned a number of critical accolades. In 1994 it was nominated for a Juno Award for Best Hard Rock Album. Toronto radio station CFNY-FM listeners voted it the 24th best album of 1993. The single "Shine" off the album was also named by Chart Magazine as number 38 on their 2000 list of Top 50 Canadian Songs Of All-Time., and 189th by CFNY in their 2009 "Top 200 Songs of All Time". "Shine" was also the theme song for MuchMusic's alternative themed show The Wedge during the 1990s.

Overview 
Crush was the Doughboys' first major label album; it peaked at #63 on the Canadian RPM albums chart staying on the chart for 16 weeks. The album was certified Gold in 1996. The album would go on to sell 75,000 copies in Canada.

The album spawned the top 40 hit single "Shine". Co-written with Wiz from Mega City Four, "Shine" also reached #2 on RPM Magazine's Canadian Content Charts in August 1993. In 1994, the single "Neighbourhood Villain" also cracked the top 5 of the Cancon charts.

The album was recorded at The Magic Shop in New York City and mixed at The Warehouse in Vancouver. At the 1994 Juno awards, the album was nominated for the Juno Award for Best Hard Rock Album, but lost to I Mother Earth.

Track listing 

All songs written by Doughboys unless otherwise indicated.

Personnel 

 Artwork By - David Andoff
 Bass, Vocals - Peter Arsenault
 Drums - Paul Newman
 Engineer - Bryce Goggin
 Mastered By - Howie Weinberg
 Mixed By - Dave Ogilvie
 Photography - cover and insert concept and photography Sean MacLeod
 Group photo. Andrew MacNaughton
 Producer - Daniel Rey
 Vocals, Guitar - John Kastner, Jonathan Cummins, Wiz

References

External links 
 Video for "Fix Me"

1993 albums
Doughboys (Canadian band) albums
Albums produced by Daniel Rey
A&M Records albums